The 2018–19 Oklahoma State Cowgirls basketball team represented Oklahoma State University in the 2018–19 NCAA Division I women's basketball season. The Cowgirls, led by eighth year head coach Jim Littell, played their home games at Gallagher-Iba Arena and were members of the Big 12 Conference. They finished the season 14–16, 5–13 in Big 12 play to finish in seventh place. They lost in the first round of the Big 12 women's tournament to Kansas.

Roster

Schedule and results

|-
!colspan=9 style=|Exhibition

|-
!colspan=9 style=| Non-conference regular season

|-
!colspan=9 style=| Big 12 Regular Season

|-
!colspan=9 style=| Big 12 Women's Tournament

Rankings
2018–19 NCAA Division I women's basketball rankings

See also
 2018–19 Oklahoma State Cowboys basketball team

References

2017-18
2018–19 Big 12 Conference women's basketball season
2018 in sports in Oklahoma
2019 in sports in Oklahoma